Christchurch and Lymington was a parliamentary constituency centred on the towns of Christchurch and Lymington in Hampshire.  It returned one Member of Parliament (MP)  to the House of Commons of the Parliament of the United Kingdom.

The constituency was created for the February 1974 general election, and abolished for the 1983 general election, when it was largely replaced by the new Christchurch constituency.

Boundaries 
The Boroughs of Christchurch and Lymington.

Members of Parliament

Election results

References 

Parliamentary constituencies in Hampshire (historic)
Parliamentary constituencies in Dorset (historic)
Constituencies of the Parliament of the United Kingdom established in 1974
Constituencies of the Parliament of the United Kingdom disestablished in 1983
Politics of Christchurch, Dorset